is the 12th studio album by Japanese singer-songwriter Miyuki Nakajima. It was released in April 1985. The album comprises nine tracks originally written for other singers, including "Kamome wa Kamome," which is known as one of the signature songs for Naoko Ken, and "Sparrow (Suzume)", which became the sole top-ten charting solo single for ex-Pink Lady member Keiko Masuda.

Track listing
All songs written by Miyuki Nakajima, except the music of "Bibou no Miyako" composed by Kyouhei Tsutsumi

Side one

Side two

Personnel

Kai Band
Yoshihiro Kai – guitars, backing vocals
Nobukazu Omori – guitars
Hideo Matsufuji – drums
Ichiro Tanaka – guitars

Sentimental City Romance
Nobutaka Tsugei – E. Guitar, Keyboards, Percussion & Chorus 
Fumio Kondo – drums
Yutaka Hosoi – keyboards, chorus
Tokuo Nakano – electric guitar, acoustic guitar, chorus
Kiyoshi Hisada – electric bass, chorus

Crystal King
Katsumasa "Monsieur" Yoshizaki – percussion, chorus
Masayuki Tanaka – chorus
Kimiharu Nakamura – piano
Hiromi Imakiire – keyboards
Michio Yamashita – electric guitars
Hidetoshi Nomoto – electric bass
Kazuyoshi Takagi – drums

Additional musicians
Yasuo Tomikura – electric bass
Tsugutoshi Goto – electric bass, electric guitar
Haruo Togashi – piano, keyboards
Elton Nagata – keyboards
Kuni Kawauchi – pipe organ
Hideki Matsutake – synthesizer programming
Shigeo Fuchino – saxophone
Kiyoshi Saito – saxophone
Pecker – percussion
Hideo Yamaki – drums
Maeda Strings – strings

Production
Composer, lyricist, Producer and Performer: Miyuki Nakajima (credited in association with Airando)
Composer for "Bibou no Miyako": Kyohei Tsutsumi
Arrangers: Chito Kawauchi (on M1,6), Nobutaka Tsugei (on M2,3,5), Michio Yamashita and Crystal King (on M4,7), Tsugutoshi Goto (on M8),Kuni Kawauchi (on M9)
Recording Director: Yoshio Okujima
Director: Yuzo Watanabe
Art Director: Jin Tamura
Designer: Hirofumi Arai
Costume Designer: Kazumi Yamase
Manager: Osamu Tsuchiya
Executive Producer: Genichi Kawakami
Special Thanks: Ken Okugawa
Mixed at the TAKE ONE and Epicurus Studios, Tokyo, Japan

Chart positions

Release history

References

Miyuki Nakajima albums
1985 albums
Pony Canyon albums
Self-covers albums